The Ministry of Trade, Commerce and Food Security is the Sri Lankan government ministry responsible for "Promotion of competitive and fair trade in the market while securing the interests of local manufacturer and consumer, promotion of co-operative services and contribution to the development of human resources in order to create a knowledge based economy."

List of ministers
The Minister of Trade, Commerce and Food Security is an appointment in the Cabinet of Sri Lanka.

Parties

See also
 Ministries of Sri Lanka

References

External links
 
 Government of Sri Lanka

Trade, Commerce and Food Security
Trade, Commerce and Food Security
Cooperatives in Sri Lanka